Best in Show is a compilation album by Australian post-grunge band Grinspoon.  The album was released on 7 November 2005 to coincide with the ten-year anniversary of the band.
The album peaked at No. 12 on the ARIA Albums Chart and was certified Gold. The album featured the band's hits and several older songs, like "Champion", which landed the song on Gran Turismo 3. The first track, "Sweet as Sugar", was specially recorded for this album and, appropriately, is a return to the earlier style of the band. The rest of the tracks are listed chronologically, from "Champion", recorded in 1996, to "Hard Act to Follow", recorded in 2004. The liner notes contain photography of the band from their beginnings to the present, and details the history of the band in the form of a fairy tale about the 'Knights of Grinspoon' from the 'Land of Oz'. The limited edition bonus disc includes a collection of covers recorded over the years.

Track listing

Charts

Weekly charts

Year-end charts

Certifications

References

Grinspoon albums
2005 greatest hits albums
Compilation albums by Australian artists